Giovanni Puoti (born Rome 1944) is an Italian rector and politician.

Life
From November 2010 to September 2013 he was rector of the Università degli Studi Niccolò Cusano.

He was a deputy minister in the government of Lamberto Dini.

Since 2015 he has been president of the Università degli Studi Niccolò Cusano.

Books
Il lavoro dipendente nel diritto tributario, Franco Angeli,1975.
Istruzione e prova nel procedimento d'imposizione, Veutro Editore, Roma, 1979.
I tributi locali.Procedimenti sanzonatori e di riscossione coattiva. Impugnazione degli atti ed opposizioni, CEDAM, 2005 (with F.Simonelli, B.Cucchi).
Diritto dell'esecuzione tributaria, CEDAM, 2007 (with B.Cucchi).
I reati tributari, CEDAM, 2008 (with F.Simonelli).
La nuova riscossione tributaria. Procedure esecutive e di notificazione, CEDAM, 2012 (with F.Simonelli, B.Cucchi) .

See also
Università degli Studi Niccolò Cusano
Fondazione Niccolò Cusano

References

External links
University Niccolò Cusano

1944 births
Living people
Università degli Studi Niccolò Cusano rectors
Italian politicians
Italian male writers